The Old Fort is a fort built in Durban, South Africa by Captain Thomas Charlton Smith's troops in 1842 as part of a visibility campaign by the British Empire to prevent Boers from establishing a republic in Natal. The facility was equipped with an arsenal and barracks in 1858, and troops were stationed there until the end of the century.

External links 
 Durban.gov.za profile

Buildings and structures in Durban
Forts in South Africa